This list of bridges in Azerbaijan lists bridges of particular historical, scenic, architectural or engineering interest. Road and railway bridges, viaducts, aqueducts and footbridges are included.

Historical and architectural interest bridges

Major road and railway bridges 
This table presents the structures with spans greater than 100 meters (non-exhaustive list).

See also 

 Transport in Azerbaijan
 Rail transport in Azerbaijan
 Geography of Azerbaijan

Notes and references 
 Notes

 

 Others references

Further reading

External links 

 

Azerbaijan
 
Bridges
Bridges